Remove, removed or remover may refer to:

 Needle remover
 Polish remover
 Staple remover
 Remove (education)
 The degree of cousinship, i.e. "once removed" or "twice removed" - see Cousin chart

See also
 Deletion (disambiguation)
 Moving (disambiguation)
 Removable (disambiguation)
 Removal (disambiguation)
 Strip (disambiguation)